Michigan's 106th House of Representatives district (also referred to as Michigan's 106th House district) is a legislative district within the Michigan House of Representatives located in parts of Cheboygan and Oscoda counties, as well as all of Alcona, Alpena, Montmorency, and Presque Isle counties. The district was created in 1965, when the Michigan House of Representatives district naming scheme changed from a county-based system to a numerical one.

List of representatives

Recent Elections

Historical district boundaries

References 

Michigan House of Representatives districts
Alcona County, Michigan
Alpena County, Michigan
Iosco County, Michigan
Presque Isle County, Michigan
Cheboygan County, Michigan